Hartford Female Seminary in Hartford, Connecticut was established in 1823, by Catharine Beecher, making it one of the first major educational institutions for women in the United States. By 1826 it had enrolled nearly 100 students. It implemented then-radical programs such as physical education courses for women. Beecher sought the aid of Mary Lyon in the development of the seminary. The Hartford Female Seminary closed towards the later half of the 19th century.

The school was first hosted in a third-floor room in a building at Main and Kinsley Streets in Hartford, then in the basement of the North Church. In 1827 the school moved into a new neoclassical building at 100 Pratt Street.

Harriet Beecher Stowe taught at the school beginning in November 1827.

Notable people
Alumni
Rose Terry Cooke
Fanny Fern
Annie Trumbull Slosson
Virginia Thrall Smith
Harriet Beecher Stowe
Mary E. Van Lennep
Sarah Woodruff Walker

Teachers
Kate Foote Coe

See also
Female seminaries
Women in education in the United States

Further reading

References

External links
1867 College Catalogue

Defunct private universities and colleges in Connecticut
Former women's universities and colleges in the United States
Educational institutions established in 1823
Education in Hartford, Connecticut
Female seminaries in the United States
19th-century disestablishments in Connecticut
History of women in Connecticut